Vatican City Heliport consists of a  rectangular concrete landing area linked with a circular parking area. It is used for short journeys from or to Vatican City by the pope and visiting heads of state.

Structure 
It is situated in the westernmost bastion of the Leonine Wall, which marks the westernmost point of Vatican City State.

History
It was constructed in 1976 under Pope Paul VI (1963–1978), facilitating transfers between Vatican City and the summer papal residence at Castel Gandolfo for occasions such as the regular Wednesday general audience, when travel by car could take a couple of hours each way and would cause inconvenience to other road users.

In 1978, Pope John Paul II had a bronze statue representing Our Lady of Częstochowa placed nearby.

Operation 
Flights are conducted only in visual meteorological conditions by visual flight rules.

Worldwide publicity was given to the heliport on the afternoon of 28 February 2013, when Pope Benedict XVI departed Vatican City for Castel Gandolfo mere hours before his resignation took effect.

Since 2015, the heliport also serves—in urgent cases—the Bambino Gesù Hospital to transport patients, personnel, and medical equipment.

The helicopter used for the pope is an AgustaWestland AW139 of the Italian Air Force.

See also
 Index of Vatican City-related articles
 Transport in Vatican City

References

External links 

 A visit to the Vatican Gardens (page 2)
 Vatican City Heliport

Transport in Vatican City
Heliports